Island of Death is a BBC Books original novel written by Barry Letts and based on the long-running British science fiction television series Doctor Who. It features the Third Doctor and Sarah Jane Smith.

Premise
Jeremy Fitzoliver and his friend Sarah Jane Smith encounter a 'New Age' cult; typical work for investigative journalists. They are surprised that the cult worships a demon-like figure.

The Doctor and UNIT also become interested in the cult. This situation soon reveals the involvement of government ministers, alien drugs, a remote island in the Indian Ocean and official conspiracies. Even the Royal Navy gets in on the action. It soon becomes a race against time to avert disaster.

Reception
Island of Death won Worst Book in the 2005 Jade Pagoda Awards.

References

External links

The Cloister Library - Island of Death

2005 British novels
2005 science fiction novels
Novels by Barry Letts
Past Doctor Adventures
Third Doctor novels